WYKR-FM (101.3 FM) is a radio station licensed to serve Haverhill, New Hampshire.  The station is owned by Puffer Broadcasting, Inc.  It airs a country music format.

The station has been assigned the WYKR-FM call letters by the Federal Communications Commission since November 10, 1988.

References

External links
 WYKR official website

YKR-FM
Country radio stations in the United States
Haverhill, New Hampshire
Radio stations established in 1990
1990 establishments in New Hampshire